Buckethead (born 1969) is an American guitarist and songwriter.

Buckethead may also refer to:

 Bucketheads, a dance music act featuring DJ and producer Kenny 'Dope' Gonzales
 "Bucketheads", a nickname given to fans of the Manawatu Turbos rugby team in New Zealand

See also
 Lord Buckethead, a British political satirist who has run for political office three times